Adamsville may refer to:

Canada
Adamsville, New Brunswick
Adamsville, Ontario, a community
Adamsville, Quebec

United States
Adamsville, Alabama
Adamsville, Arizona, a former settlement
Adamsville, California, a former settlement
Adamsville, Delaware
Adamsville (Atlanta), Georgia, a neighborhood
Adamsville, Colrain, Massachusetts
 Adamsville, Hillsborough County, Florida
 Adamsville, Sumter County, Florida
Adamsville, Kansas
Salyersville, Kentucky, formerly known as Adamsville
Adamsville, Michigan
Adamsville, Ohio, a village in Muskingum County
Adamsville, Gallia County, Ohio
Adamsville, Pennsylvania
Adamsville, Rhode Island
Adamsville, Tennessee
Adamsville, Texas
Adamsville, Utah
Adamsville, West Virginia
Adamsville, Wisconsin